Mario Marchegiani (born 27 November 1917) was an Italian professional football player.

Marchegiani played for 2 seasons (5 games) in the Serie A for A.S. Roma.

References

1917 births
Possibly living people
Italian footballers
Serie A players
Frosinone Calcio players
A.S. Roma players
S.S.D. Sanremese Calcio players
Association football midfielders